Gabrison Brig Holmes (born March 29, 1991) is an American football tight end who is currently a free agent. He was originally signed by the Oakland Raiders as an undrafted free agent in 2015. He played college football at Purdue.

Professional career

Oakland Raiders
After going undrafted in the 2015 NFL Draft, Holmes signed with the Oakland Raiders on May 8, 2015. On September 15, 2015, he was waived by the Raiders and was re-signed to the practice squad. On November 13, Holmes was promoted to the active roster. On August 29, 2016, Holmes was placed on injured reserve after suffering an ankle injury in the preseason. On September 2, 2017, Holmes was waived by the Raiders.

Seattle Seahawks
On September 13, 2017, Holmes was signed to the Seattle Seahawks practice squad. He was released on September 26, 2017.

Baltimore Ravens
On October 3, 2017, Holmes was signed to the Baltimore Ravens' practice squad, He was released on October 24, 2017.

Arizona Cardinals
On November 30, 2017, Holmes was signed to the Arizona Cardinals' practice squad. He was promoted to the active roster on December 16, 2017. He was waived on October 30, 2018 and was re-signed to the practice squad the next day.

Indianapolis Colts
On January 19, 2019, Holmes signed a reserve/future contract with the Indianapolis Colts. On August 31, 2019, Holmes was waived by the Colts.

St. Louis BattleHawks
Holmes signed with the XFL's Team 9 practice squad during the regular season. He was signed off of Team 9 by the St. Louis BattleHawks on March 9, 2020. He had his contract terminated when the league suspended operations on April 10, 2020.

Holmes signed with the Alphas of The Spring League in May 2021.

Miami Dolphins
On August 3, 2021, Holmes signed with the Miami Dolphins, but waived two days later.

Tennessee Titans
Holmes was signed by the Tennessee Titans on August 11, 2021. He was waived on August 15.

References

External links
 Oakland Raiders bio
 Purdue Boilermakers bio

1991 births
Living people
American football tight ends
Arizona Cardinals players
Baltimore Ravens players
Indianapolis Colts players
Miami Dolphins players
Oakland Raiders players
People from Miramar, Florida
Purdue Boilermakers football players
Seattle Seahawks players
Sportspeople from Broward County, Florida
St. Louis BattleHawks players
Team 9 players
The Spring League players
Tennessee Titans players